This article is a list of military conflicts involving Ghana and includes conflicts such as coups.

Wars

Violent coups and coup attempts

See also
 List of conflicts in Ghana
 Ghanaian Armed Forces

References 

Wars
 
Ghana
Wars